Cornelius J. Doyle  (1862–1931) was an Irish born Major League Baseball outfielder. He played in the Majors in 1883 and 1884 for the Philadelphia Quakers and Pittsburgh Alleghenys. He continued to play professionally in the minor leagues through 1893.

External links
Baseball Reference.com page

1862 births
1931 deaths
Philadelphia Quakers players
Pittsburgh Alleghenys players
Major League Baseball outfielders
Major League Baseball players from Ireland
Irish baseball players
Irish emigrants to the United States (before 1923)
Quincy Quincys players
Kansas City Cowboys (minor league) players
Atlanta Atlantas players
Memphis Browns players
Hartford Dark Blues (minor league) players
Charleston Seagulls players
New Orleans Pelicans (baseball) players
Lynn Shoemakers players
San Francisco Haverlys players
Peoria Canaries players
New Haven Nutmegs players
Syracuse Stars (minor league baseball) players
Utica Stars players
19th-century baseball players
Memphis Reds players